The following is a list of programs currently or formerly distributed through the American PBS stations and other public television entities.

Current programming
1 Syndicated to public television stations by the National Educational Telecommunications Association.
2 Syndicated to public television stations by Executive Program Services.
3 Syndicated to public television stations by WestLink.
4 Running only on selected PBS stations.
5 Reruns are available to public television stations.

Original programming

Washington Week (1967)
 American Black Journal (1968)
Masterpiece (1971)
Great Performances (1972)
Nova (1974)
PBS NewsHour (1975)
Austin City Limits (1976)
The Woodwright's Shop (1979)
This Old House (1979)
MotorWeek (1981)
Nature (1982)
Frontline (1983)
American Masters (1986)
American Experience (1988)
P.O.V. (1988)
Ciao Italia (1989)
Antiques Roadshow (1997)
Independent Lens (1999)
Secrets of the Dead (2000)
Ask This Old House (2002)
BBC World News America (2019)
Finding Your Roots (2012)
Reel South (2016)
Destination Craft with Jim West (2017)
Amanpour & Company (2018)
Beyond 100 Days (2018)
We'll Meet Again (2018)
Prehistoric Road Trip (2020)
Tell Me More with Kelly Corrigan (2020)
The Trouble with Maggie Cole (2020)
When Disaster Strikes (2021)

Programming from American Public Television

Acquired programming

The American Woodshop1 (1993)
BBC World News Today (2018)
Broadway Sandwich (2019)
Closer to Truth2 (2008)
Cobra (2020)
Creative Living with Sheryl Borden3 (1976)
The Daytripper1 (2010)
Democracy Now!3 (2001)
Fons & Porter's Love of Quilting1 (2003)
GardenSMART1 (2001)
Green
Martha Bakes
Martha Stewart's Cooking School
Men at Work
The Open Mind1 (1956)
Simple Living with Wanda Urbanska
Sit and Be Fit1 (1987)
Start Up1 (2013)
A Taste of History1 (2008)
Texas Parks & Wildlife1 (1985)
This Is America & the World with Dennis Wholey1 (1998)
WoodSongs1 (2006)

Former programming
Original programming

3-2-1 Contact (1980–92)
A.M. Weather (1978–95)
Africa (2013)
African American World
American Playhouse (1982–99)
America's Ballroom Challenge (2006–09)
Are You Being Served?
Art of the Western World (1989)
As Time Goes By
Backyard Jungle
BBC World News
Big Apple History
Bill Moyers Journal (1972–76; 1978–81; 2007–10)
Biography of America
Carrascolendas
Carrier (2008)
Celtic Thunder
Celtic Woman
Charlie Rose (1991–2017)
A Chef's Life (2013–18)
Childhood
China: A Century of Revolution (1989–1997)
Click and Clack's As the Wrench Turns (2008)
Columbus and the Age of Discovery
Computer Chronicles (1983–2002)
Connect With English (1998)
The Constitution: That Delicate Balance (1984)
Cosmos: A Personal Voyage (1980)
The Creation of the Universe
Crucible of Empire (1999)
Day at Night (1973–74)
Dave Allen at Large (1971–79)
Degrassi Junior High (1987–91)
Degrassi High (1990–95)
design: e2
Destinos (1992)
The Dick Cavett Show (1977–82)
Discover The World of Science (1982–90)
Discovering Psychology: Updated Edition
Doctor Who (1970–90)
Don't Look Now (1983)
EGG, the Arts Show (2000–05)
The Electric Company (1971–85)
Ethics in America (1988–89)
Evening at Pops (1970–2005)
Everyday Food (2003–12)
Feeling Good
Firing Line
Fokus Deutsch
Free to Choose
The French Chef
French in Action
The Frugal Gourmet
GED Connection
Genius by Stephen Hawking (2016)
The Health Quarterly
Healthful Indian Flavors with Alamelu
History Detectives (2003–14)
Hometime (1986–2016)
Inspector MorseThe Infinite VoyageInfinity FactoryInside Nature's GiantsIn the Mix (1991–2012)IrasshaiIt's Strictly BusinessJazz (2001)Julia and Jacques Cooking at HomeKeeping Up AppearancesKokoro: The Heart Within (1995)Learn to ReadLife on FireLilias, Yoga and YouLiterary VisionsLittle SnackLong Ago and Far Away (1989–94)Matinee at the BijouThe McLaughlin Group (1982–2016)The Mechanical UniverseMeeting of MindsMercy Street (2016–17)The Mind (1988)Mr. BeanMystery! (1980–2006)National Geographic Specials (1975-1994)New Project 300The New Red Green ShowThe New Yankee WorkshopNewton's Apple (1983–99)Nova ScienceNowNOWOdyssey (1980-1981)On TourOnce Upon A ClassicOver EasyOWL/TV (1985–91)The PallisersPBS American Portrait (2021)A Place of Our Own (1998–2011)The Power of Choice (1988–91)Powerhouse (1982–83)Race to Save the PlanetRamona (1988–90)Reading Rainbow (1983–2009)Rebop (1976–79)Religion & Ethics Newsweekly (1997–2017)Roadtrip NationThe Romagnolis' TableSay BrotherSessions at West 54thShining Time Station (1989–98)Silver Screen: host Thomas GubackSneak PreviewsSoundstageSquare One Television (1987–94)Studio See (1977–79)Taking the Lead: The Management RevolutionTalking with David FrostTavis Smiley (2004–2017)Tony Brown's JournalTrying TimesThe Two RonniesVegetable SoupThe Vicar of DibleyThe Victory Garden (1975–2015)Villa AlegreVoices & VisionsWalk Through the 20th Century with Bill MoyersWall $treet WeekThe Western TraditionWhere in the World Is Carmen Sandiego? (1991–96)Wide AngleWild AmericaWired ScienceWonderWorks (1984–90)The World of ChemistryZoobilee Zoo (1988–92)Zoom'' (1972–78)

Programming from American Public Television

Acquired programming

Special programming

See also
List of PBS member stations
List of programs broadcast by Create
List of programs broadcast by PBS Kids (block)
List of programs broadcast by PBS Kids
List of programs broadcast by American Public Television

References

External links
PBS.org: Search programs A-Z

PBS
PBS